Michael Aaron Walker (born June 23, 1965 in Houston, Texas) is an American former professional baseball player.

Career
Walker, who prefers to go by Mike, was raised in Splendora/Cleveland, Texas by his parents Barbara and L.G. In High School, Mike aka "The Walk" was an All-Star athlete who lettered in basketball and baseball. He went to the University of Houston on a scholarship and, as a pitcher, enjoyed many successes as a Cougar.

On June 2, 1986 Mike was drafted by the Pittsburgh Pirates in the 2nd round of the 1986 MLB draft. He was named Most Valuable Player on numerous occasions and recognized as one of the Carolina League's most prestigious players during 1987, leading Salem to the league championship. Briefly, he spent time in the AA club in Harrisburg, Pennsylvania.

In , Mike married Dina (Becker) and had headed back to Buffalo, New York to once again play for the Pirates' AAA club.  However, on April 21, along with minor leaguer Mark Merchant, Walker was traded to the Seattle Mariners for Rey Quiñones and Bill Wilkinson. Mike played for Seattle's Triple A farm team, the Calgary Cannons for the next few seasons. The Mariners and Walker joined forces for the next 5 years. In , after a short recovery from shoulder surgery, Mike was called to the major leagues. He made his MLB debut on June 16, 1992. Walker played for Seattle for just shy of one month and never spent another day in the  MLB.

Over the following years, Mike played for the San Francisco Giants and the Texas Rangers organizations.

References

External links

1965 births
Living people
American expatriate baseball players in Canada
American expatriate baseball players in Mexico
Baseball players from Houston
Buffalo Bisons (minor league) players
Calgary Cannons players
Diablos Rojos del México players
Harrisburg Senators players
Houston Cougars baseball players
Jacksonville Suns players
Major League Baseball pitchers
Mexican League baseball pitchers
Oklahoma City 89ers players
Phoenix Firebirds players
Salem Buccaneers players
Seattle Mariners players
Watertown Pirates players